Jane Alden Stevens is an American photographer and educator.  Solo exhibitions of her work have been mounted at the ARC Gallery in Chicago, the Herbert F. Johnson Museum of Art in Ithaca, NY, and the Pittsburgh Filmmakers Gallery. She has exhibited extensively abroad, including in Finland, Ukraine, Belgium, Germany, and Brazil. Stevens’ photographs are included in the permanent collections of the George Eastman House International Museum of Photography and Film in Rochester, NY, the Cincinnati Art Museum, and the Museu da Imagem e do Som in São Paulo, Brazil. She is Professor Emerita of Fine Arts at the University of Cincinnati.

Early life and education 
Following her graduation magna cum laude from St. Lawrence University in Canton, N.Y., with a BA in 19th-century European Studies. She traveled and lived in Germany for a number of years teaching English as a second language and working as a tour guide.

After returning to the United States she attended an MFA program for photography at the Rochester Institute of Technology, in Rochester, New York. After she graduated in 1982 she was offered a position in the Fine Arts Department at the University of Cincinnati, she began teaching courses in photography, film and professional business practices for fine artists.

Career 
Stevens was a full-time Fine Arts faculty member at The University of Cincinnati at the College of Design, Architecture, Art and Planning from 1984 to 2003. Currently a Professor Emerita of Fine Arts, University of Cincinnati, OH

Work

Seeking Perfection 
Seeking Perfection: Traditional Apple Growing in Japan portfolio documents a specialized form of apple cultivation in the Aomori Prefecture in Japan. Stevens mostly used the Pinoramic 120, the Hasselblad and the Noblex Pro 6/150U cameras to capture what she was looking for in terms of depth-of-field, scope of the scene, and how close she wanted to get for certain shots.

Tears of Stone: World War I Remembered  
This documented the war's lasting impact in large black-and-white images that included  destruction still visible in barraged, upended, pockmarked fields; abandoned towns that were never rebuilt; mementos left by families who still make pilgrimages to World War I cemeteries and sculptures that record unhealed grief.

The project was supported by $23,000 from UC, the English Speaking Union and Ohio Arts Council. Stevens made five two-week trips to 189 sites and a selection of her photos was published in Tears of Stone: World War I Remembered.

Selected permanent collections 
 The Center for Photography as an Art Form, Bombay, India
 Center for Photography, Woodstock, NY
 Cincinnati Art Museum, Cincinnati, OH
 George Eastman House: International Museum of Photography & Film, Rochester, NY Harry Ransom Humanities Research Center, University of Texas, Austin, TX
 Museum of Fine Arts Houston
 Museum of Photography, Kharkiv, Ukraine
 Museu de Arte Contemporanea, São Paulo, Brazil

Published books

References

External links 
Official Website
The Art of Caring: A Look at Life Through Photography

University of Cincinnati faculty
American women photographers
Artists from Cincinnati
Living people
1952 births
Educators from Cincinnati
American women academics
21st-century American women